Max Grundmann (born 16 August 1998) is a German footballer who plays as a defender for BFC Dynamo.

References

External links
 Profile at DFB.de
 Profile at kicker.de
 

1998 births
Living people
People from Gransee
Footballers from Brandenburg
German footballers
Association football defenders
FC Energie Cottbus II players
FC Energie Cottbus players
Berliner FC Dynamo players
3. Liga players
Regionalliga players